Cleto Maule (14 March 1931 – 28 July 2013) was an Italian racing cyclist. He won the 1955 edition of the Giro di Lombardia.

References

External links
 

1931 births
2013 deaths
Italian male cyclists
Cyclists from the Province of Vicenza